Awami Muslim League may refer to:

 Awami Muslim League (Pakistan), founded in 2008
 Bangladesh Awami League, named All Pakistan Awami Muslim League until 1953

See also
Awami (disambiguation)
Muslim League (disambiguation)